Rich Jeffries (born Jefferson Ray Richards, September 1, 1938March 30, 2012) was an American television announcer.

Early life
Rich grew up in Atlanta, Georgia and attended Bass High School. After being a drummer in a local band, Rich decided to enter show business and moved to Los Angeles, California to pursue a career as a TV and movie actor. After appearing in bit roles on various television shows and movies, Rich worked as a lighting technician before beginning work for Mark Goodson Productions.

Career
Jeffries also was the first announcer of Super Password with Bert Convy in the mid 1980s.

Although there are no references provided to substantiate the following claims, it's believed Jeffries was a frequent substitute announcer. Among the shows he subbed on were Password Plus and The Match Game-Hollywood Squares Hour, substituting for Wood; Time Machine, where he subbed for Charlie Tuna, and Love Connection, where he subbed for Wood, once again, which was his last substitute announcing job, before the job was given to veteran game show announcer Johnny Gilbert, and later to John Cervenka, one of The Groundlings. Jeffries was also one of the rotation of announcers that took turns announcing for The Price Is Right after original announcer Johnny Olson died in 1985, but was passed over in favor of Rod Roddy in 1986.

Personal life and death
Jeffries was married to Brenda Chitwood, whom he married in 1978, and the two lived in southern California.

Jeffries died on March 30, 2012 from complications due to pulmonary fibrosis at the age of 73.

References

External links
 

1938 births
2012 deaths
Deaths from pulmonary fibrosis
Game show announcers
People from Atlanta